Marion Hamilton may refer to:

Marion Adams-Acton, maiden name Hamilton, Scottish novelist
Letitia Marion Hamilton, Irish artist